Palak Kohli (born 12 August 2002) is an Indian professional para-badminton athlete player from Jalandhar.

Personal life 
Palak Kohli comes from Jalandhar. She studied in St.Joseph's Convent school.

Career 
Kohli trains in the national training camp under Gaurav Khanna, who is the head coach of Indian para-badminton team.

In April 2021, she and Manasi Joshi both reached the finals of the Dubai Para-Badminton International at their respective singles category. She was beaten by Megan Hollander in the SU5 final.

Kohli is the only para badminton athlete from the country to qualify for both singles and women's doubles for Tokyo Paralympics 2021.

Achievements

Asian Youth Para Games 
Women's singles

Doubles

Mixed doubles

BWF Para Badminton World Circuit (1 title, 2 runners-up) 
The BWF Para Badminton World Circuit – Grade 2, Level 1, 2 and 3 tournaments has been sanctioned by the Badminton World Federation from 2022.

Women's doubles

Mixed doubles

International Tournaments (3 titles, 4 runners-up) 
Men's singles

Men's doubles

Mixed doubles

References 

Living people
2002 births
Indian female badminton players
Indian female para-badminton players
People from Jalandhar
Racket sportspeople from Punjab, India
Sportswomen from Punjab, India
Paralympic badminton players of India
Badminton players at the 2020 Summer Paralympics
21st-century Indian women